Jo Mallon (23 October 1905 – 2 May 1970) was a Dutch middle-distance runner. She competed in the women's 800 metres at the 1928 Summer Olympics.

References

1905 births
1970 deaths
Athletes (track and field) at the 1928 Summer Olympics
Dutch female middle-distance runners
Olympic athletes of the Netherlands
Sportspeople from Gouda, South Holland
20th-century Dutch women